Jiri Veistola (born March 21, 1988) is a Finnish ice hockey player. His is currently playing with Ilves in the Finnish SM-liiga.

Veistola made his SM-liiga debut playing with Jokerit during the 2007–08 SM-liiga season.

References

External links

1988 births
Living people
Finnish ice hockey right wingers
Ice hockey people from Helsinki
Espoo United players
Ilves players
Jokerit players
Kiekko-Vantaa players
KooKoo players
Lempäälän Kisa players